The women's team compound competition at the 2007 World Archery Championships took place in July 2007 in Leipzig, Germany. 18 teams of three archers took part in the women's compound qualification round, and the 16 teams with the highest cumulative totals qualified for the four-round knockout round, drawn according to their qualification round scores. The semi-finals and finals then took place on 14 July.

Belgium were the surprise winners of the tournament, knocking out Russia and France before defeating Italy in the final. Top qualifiers the United States set a 24-arrow world record of 232 in their quarter-final round against Germany.

Seeds
Seedings were based on the combined total of the team members' qualification scores in the individual ranking rounds. The top 16 teams were assigned places in the draw depending on their overall ranking.

Draw

References

2007 World Archery Championships
World